Stefan Edberg was the defending champion, but decide to rest after competing at the Davis Cup the previous week.

Yannick Noah won the title by defeating Ronald Agénor 7–6(8–6), 6–4, 6–4 in the final.

Seeds

Draw

Finals

Top half

Bottom half

References

External links
 Official results archive (ATP)
 Official results archive (ITF)

1987 Grand Prix (tennis)